Steppenwolf is a 1974 film adaptation of Hermann Hesse's 1927 novel Steppenwolf, directed by Fred Haines. The film made heavy use of visual special effects that were cutting-edge at the time of its release. It follows the adventures of a half-man, half-animal individual named Harry Haller, who in the Germany of the 1920s, is depressed, resentful of his middle class station, and wants to die not knowing the world around him. He then meets two strange people who introduce him to life and a bizarre world called the "Magic Theater".

Cast
Max von Sydow as Harry Haller
Dominique Sanda as Hermine
Pierre Clementi as Pablo
Carla Romanelli as Maria
Roy Bosier as Aztec
Alfred Baillou as Johann Wolfgang von Goethe
Niels-Peter Rudolph as Gustav
Helmut Förnbacher as Franz
Charles Regnier as Loering
Eduard Linkers as Mr. Hefte
Silvia Reize as Dora
Judith Mellies as Rosa O`Flynn
Helen Hesse as Frau Hefte

Source:

Cast notes:
Helen Hesse was Herman Hesse's granddaughter.  Hesse's daughter-in-law, Ida, worked as a still photographer on the set.

Production
The film took seven years of complicated pre-production because its producers, Melvin Abner Fishman and Richard Herland – a student of Jung and alchemy – wanted the film to be "the first Jungian film" and built up relationships with the Hesse family that allowed the film rights of the book to be released. Herland raised the finances.

Directors Michelangelo Antonioni and John Frankenheimer, as well as the actor James Coburn were all touted to direct the film. In the end, the film was directed by its screenwriter, Fred Haines.

Although Walter Matthau, Jack Lemmon and Timothy Leary were all proposed as playing the main role of Harry Haller, the role eventually went to Max von Sydow.  Although the film was made in English, none of the principal actors were native English speakers.

Steppenwolf was filmed on location in Basel, Switzerland, Wiesbaden, Germany, and at Studio Hamburg in Germany.

Finally, the rights to the finished film were entirely given over to Peter Sprague, its financier. A "marketing disaster" followed, which included the colour of the prints coming out incorrectly. For decades the film remained little seen except for brief runs in art film houses.

Reception
After a festival screening, a review
 
in the Los Angeles Free Press found the film "beautifully shot, well-acted, but only partly successful", attributing this to the difficulty in translating to the screen Hesse's "stream-of-consciousness, interior writing" style. The reviewer, Jacoba Atlas, highlighted "one of the finest ‘dream’ sequences ever put on film [...] using every cinematic technique from step-printing to chromatic negatives".

Upon the film's release on home video, Bernard Holland wrote of it in The New York Times:
This film adaptation of the Herman Hesse novel is one of those plunges into the “meaning-of-life” genre that still might excite the college freshman with intellectual pretensions but one whose excesses will seem a little silly—or boring—to most of the rest of us.
Its good-versus-evil thesis is expounded through a variety of surreal effects—including animated cartoons. Hesse's philosophical thinking—often obvious on the printed page—translates even less forcefully to film. Mr. von Sydow is reasonably tortured as the straddler of innocence and depravity and Miss Sanda exudes a hard, shallow beauty as his seductive counterpart.

References

External links

1974 films
1974 drama films
Swiss drama films
British drama films
French drama films
Italian drama films
American drama films
English-language French films
English-language Italian films
English-language Swiss films
Films based on German novels
Films based on Swiss novels
Adaptations of works by Hermann Hesse
1970s English-language films
1970s American films
1970s British films
1970s Italian films
1970s French films